Sino-Latin America relations are relations between China — which is by defined as either the People's Republic of China (PRC, China) or the Republic of China (ROC, Taiwan) — and the countries of Latin America. Such relations have become increasingly important between the region and Latin America.

Trade 
Between 2000 and 2009, trade between China and Latin America increased by 1,200% from $10 to $130 billion. According to the Chinese Trade Ministry Counselor Yu Zhong, in 2011 the value of trade increased to $241.5 billion, making China the second largest trading partner of Latin America (the USA is the largest). The top five nations in this China-Latin trade were Brazil, Mexico, Chile, Venezuela and Argentina.

In 2009 7% of Latin America's exports was to China. It consisted largely of raw material and commodities such as copper, iron ore, oil, and soybeans. China was the largest export market for Brazil, Chile, and Peru and the second largest for Argentina, Costa Rica, and Cuba. Four nations contributed 90% of the exports:  Brazil (41%), Chile (23.1%), Argentina (15.9%), and Peru (9.3%). Increased Chinese demand has also been argued to increase the commodity prices of Latin American exports. In the case of Brazil the rise of a new middle class has even been seen as due to Chinese commodity demand. On the other hand, a large part of the exports of Costa Rica (which has a Free Trade Agreement with China), El Salvador, and Mexico to China were high-tech manufactured goods.

5% of China's exports went to Latin America in 2009 and consisted mainly of industrial and manufactured goods. Chinese goods are popular in part due to their low costs. Chinese manufacturers are also making substantial efforts to establish themselves as brand names for the new middle class. China is investing in power plants in Brazil, and repairing a railway in Argentina.

According to a 2012 Fitch ratings report, in 2010, 92% of Latin American exports to China were commodities; 85% of Chinese foreign direct investment went to extractive industries as did 60% of Chinese loans. The report stated that the effects are mixed but overall Latin America has benefited from the relationship with China by higher commodity prices, increased growth, increased investment, and improved governmental financials. There are also concerns of environmental impacts related to the huge increase in extractive industries and agriculture by Chinese companies in Latin America, including pollution, deforestation, habitat destruction and rising fossil-fuel emissions.

There have been concerns regarding the relationship due to Latin American dependency on exports of low-value added, highly price volatile commodities that employ relatively few people. Latin American manufacturers have faced increasing competition from China on both domestic and international markets. In some countries there have protests against the raising inflow of Chinese manufactured goods, local Chinese businesses, and perceived loss of manufacturing jobs to China.

The book The Dragon in the Room: China and the Future of Latin America found that 92% manufacturing exports from Latin American were in sectors where China was increasing its market share while Latin America was decreasing its share, or where both China and Latin America where increasing their shares but Latin America at a slower rate. Several experts have even argued that the long-term outlooks for Latin American manufacturing are poor and other sources for growth and trade such as services should be sought.

After the 2015–16 Chinese stock market turbulence many Chinese investment projects in Latin America were canceled or have slowed. These include the Nicaragua Canal.

Political 
China has been seen as an alternative to the United States and Europe by Latin American nations for support in the international community, for funding of infrastructure and humanitarian aid, and for creating economic growth. The number of high-level meetings between Chinese and Latin American officials have rapidly increased. These have been accompanied by several bilateral agreements. The creation of the BRICS group also helped to increase relations between China and Brazil.

WikiLeaks diplomatic cables describe a divided Latin American opinion regarding China. Neil Dávila, head of Mexico's federal agency for promoting foreign commerce and investments, stated "We do not want to be China's next Africa," reflecting a common concern regarding the effects of Chinese involvement in Africa. Colombia, Brazil, and Chile also expressed concerns while Venezuela and Argentina were convinced that dependency on  the United States must end and saw China as the greatest opportunity for their exports. Chinese officials in response has accused US diplomats of spreading mistrust and Chinese Vice-president Xi Jinping in 2009 in Mexico stated that "China does not export revolution. China exports neither hunger nor poverty. We do not cause problems. What more can be said of us?"

Many of the nations that continue to have official diplomatic relations with Taiwan are in Central America and the Caribbean. Taiwan has previously offered military exchanges and training as well as economic aid in return but has more recently had difficulty competing with China's economic incentives and in 2008 officially abandoned this "checkbook diplomacy". The remaining pro-Taiwan nations have been seen as waiting for better Chinese offers.

The formation of Community of Latin American and Caribbean States was warmly welcome by China in 2011. Hugo Chavez read aloud a letter from China's Paramount leader Hu Jintao congratulating the leaders on forming the new regional bloc. On January 8, 2015, the 1st China-CELAC Forum opened at the Great Hall of the People in China.

In January 2019, numerous countries including the US recognized the legitimacy of opposition leader Juan Guaido as President of Venezuela. The PRC issued an official statement condemning American intervention in the internal affairs of Venezuela, supporting Nicolás Maduro in the struggle for the Venezuelan presidency.

Military 
Military relationships have been mainly through military-to-military contacts. In particular Venezuela, Chile, Bolivia, and Cuba have had frequent official military visits, exchange of military officers, and navy port calls. South American countries such as Venezuela, Bolivia, Ecuador, Peru and Argentina are buying Chinese weapons. Chile, Ecuador and Peru were visited by a Chinese flotilla in 2009.

In 2011 China and Bolivia signed a military-to-military cooperation agreement.

In 2015, China's Paramount leader Xi Jinping and President of Argentina, Cristina Fernandez de Kirchner, announced prospective arms sales and defense cooperation agreements extending beyond the scope of any made between China and a Latin American nation to date. These plans include Argentina’s purchase or coproduction of 110 8×8 VN-1 APCs, 14 JF-17/FC-1 multirole fighters, and five P18 Malvinas class patrol ships. While the government of President Mauricio Macri, elected in December 2015, soon dropped the arms purchases from China. that also authorizes construction of satellite tracking facility near Las Lajas, Neuquén; base is managed by People's Liberation Army Strategic Support Force. Per Argentinian ambassador to China, Diego Guelar, China has agreed to use the base only for civilian purposes.
 
In King George Island, Antarctica, China and Chile share side-by-side military facilities. In 1982, with Pinochet's Chile allowed, China built a Great Wall research station in the Antarctic inside Chile's territorial claims.

Space 
China has launched communication satellites (from launch sites in China) for Venezuela, Bolivia, Ecuador, Brazil, and Argentina.

Regional organizations 
In 2004 China joined the Organization of American States as a permanent observer. In 2008 China joined the Inter-American Development Bank as a donor. China has also increased its relationships with CELAC, the Andean Community, and the Caribbean Community.

Cultural 

The PRC actively seeks cultural exchanges with Latin America and CCTV-4 America has extensive Spanish language programming.

See also 
 Chinatowns in Latin America
Debt-trap diplomacy

References

Further reading

 Hu-DeHart, Evelyn, and Kathleen López. "Asian Diasporas in Latin America and the Caribbean: An Historical Overview." Afro-Hispanic Review (2008): 9-21. in JSTOR
 Hu-DeHart, Evelyn. "Indispensable enemy or convenient scapegoat? A critical examination of sinophobia in Latin America and the Caribbean, 1870s to 1930s." Journal of Chinese Overseas 5.1 (2009): 55–90.
 López, Kathleen M. Chinese Cubans: A Transnational History (2013)
López-Calvo, Ignacio, ed.  Alternative Orientalisms in Latin America and Beyond. (Cambridge Scholars Publishing, 2007). 
 Meagher, Arnold J. The Coolie trade: the traffic in Chinese laborers to Latin America 1847-1874 (2008).
 Ryan, Keegan D. "The Extent of Chinese Influence in Latin America" (Naval Postgraduate School, 2018) online.
 Young, Elliott. Alien Nation: Chinese Migration in the Americas from the Coolie Era Through World War II (2014).
 

Foreign relations of China
Latin America